Highway 272 (AR 272, Ark. 272, and Hwy. 272) is a designation for two east–west state highways in the Ouachita Mountains region of western Arkansas. One segment of  runs west from U.S. Route 71 Business (US 71B) in Waldron to the Waldron Municipal Airport. A second route of  begins at US 59/US 270 at Rich Mountain and runs west to Highway 88 at Queen Wilhelmina State Park. Both routes are owned and maintained by the Arkansas Department of Transportation (ArDOT).

Route description

Waldron to Waldron Municipal Airport

The highway begins at US 71B (Main St) in Waldron and runs west as Crumptown Rd. The highway has a brief overlap with US 71, called an officially designated exception. Following this overlap, the highway breaks west and terminates at the Waldron Municipal Airport.

Queen Wilhelmina State Park to US 59/US 270

The western terminus of the route is at Highway 88 in Queen Wilhelmina State Park, near the summit of Rich Mountain. The eastern terminus is at the concurrency of U.S. Route 270 and U.S. Route 59. The highway gains over 650 feet (200 m) along its course.

History
The segment between Waldron and the airport was adopted as a state highway by the Arkansas State Highway Commission on March 28, 1973.

Major intersections

|-
| align=center colspan=6 | Highway 272 begins in at US 59/US 270

See also
 
 
 Arkansas Highway 980, the traditional highway designation for airport roads in Arkansas

Notes

References

272
Transportation in Polk County, Arkansas
Transportation in Scott County, Arkansas